The Škoda 100 mm Model 16/19 (100 mm M.16/19) was a mountain howitzer modified by Škoda Works from the design of the M.16, and its most notable difference was the longer barrel. It is unclear if they were newly built, or rebuilt from older howitzers. The Czechoslovak Army used this gun in both its 100 mm and 105 mm variants. After 1938, the guns were used by the Wehrmacht as 10 cm GebH 16/19(t) and 10.5 cm GebH(t). In addition, some of these guns were also used by Italy and Turkey, although this needs confirmation. The gun broke down into 3 loads for transport. The gun crew was protected by an armoured shield.

Notes

References
 Chamberlain, Peter & Gander, Terry. Infantry, Mountain and Airborne Guns. New York: Arco, 1975
 Gander, Terry and Chamberlain, Peter. Weapons of the Third Reich: An Encyclopedic Survey of All Small Arms, Artillery and Special Weapons of the German Land Forces 1939–1945. New York: Doubleday, 1979 
 Hogg, Ian Twentieth-Century Artillery. New York: Barnes & Nobles, 2000 

Mountain artillery
World War II mountain artillery
Artillery of Czechoslovakia
100 mm artillery